Jakob Klaesi (29 May 1883 – 17 August 1980) was a Swiss psychiatrist most notable for his contributions to the sleep therapy and his phenomenological analysis of expression.

Life
From 1903 to 1909, Klaesi studied medicine in Zurich, Kiel and Munich; in 1912 he received his doctorate in Zurich and was then trained as a psychiatrist. From 1923 to 1926 he was chief physician at the Psychiatric University Clinic in Basel, and later head of the private clinic Knonau. From 1933 he was extraordinary Professor, 1936-53 full professor of psychiatry at University of Bern (rector from 1950 to 1951 ) and director of the Psychiatric Clinic Waldau beginning 1 April 1933.

Klaesi was known for the introduction of the Sleep Treatment (1921). He set up colonies for the sick, and in 1934, he founded the psychiatric clinic of Berne. As a teacher he influenced the training of physicians significantly. Klaesi wrote also poems and plays.

Published works 
 Klaesi, Jakob (1917), "Ueber psychiatrischpoliklinische Behandlungsmethoden", Z. Ges. Neurol. Psychiat., 36:431–450
 Klaesi, Jakob (1917), "Die psychogenen Ursachen der essentiellen Enuresis nocturna infantum", Schweiz. Arch. Neurol. Psychiat. 35:371
 Klaesi, Jakob (1921), "Ueber Somnifen, eine medikamentöse Therapie schizophrener Aufregungszustände", Schweiz. Arch. Neurol. Psychiat. 8:131
 Klaesi, Jakob (1922), "Ueber die therapeutische Anwendung der ‘Dauernarkose’ mittels Somnifen bei Schizophrenen",Z. Ges. Neurol. Psychiat., 74:557
 Klaesi, Jakob (1937), "Die Irrenanstalt als Weg zur Rückkehr ins Leben", In: Vom seelischen Kranksein, Vorbeugen und Heilen. Paul Haupt, Bern/Leipzig
 Klaesi, Jakob (1938), "Ohne Insulin", Schweiz. Med. Wochenschr. 68:1164
 Klaesi, Jakob (1950), "Der unheilbare Kranke und seine Behandlung", Rektoratsrede University of Berne, 18. 11. 1950, Paul Haupt, Bern
 Klaesi, Jakob (1952) "Psychotherapie in der Klinik", Montasschr. Psychiat. Neurol. 124: 334–353
 Klaesi, Jakob (1953) "Ueber Neurosenlehre und Psychotherapie", In: von Bergmann, G. (Editor), Handbuch der Inneren Medizin, Springer, Berlin/Göttingen/Heidelberg
 Klaesi, Jakob (1969), Gott und sein Zweifler, Werner Classen, Zürich
 Klaesi, Jakob (1977), "Psychiatrie in Selbstdarstellungen", In: Pongratz L. J. (Editor). ... Hans Huber, Bern

Further reading
 Bleuler, Manfred (1953) "Jakob Klaesi in der endokrinologischen Psychiatrie", Monatsschrift für Psychiatrie und Neurologie Nr.125, p.310–319 
 Wyss, Dieter (1966), Die tiefenpsychologischen Schulen von den Anfängen bis zur Gegenwart, Vandenhoeck & Ruprecht, Göttingen
 Spoerri, Theodor (1973), "Eine urtümliche, anti-sozio-scholastische, anumerische Psychiatrie: Jakob Klaesi zum 90. Geburtstag" Psychiatria clinica, 1973, Nr.6, p.370-372 
 Ellenberger, Henri Frédéric (1975), Die Entdeckung des Unbewussten. Hans Huber, Bern
 Haenel, Thomas (1979), "Jakob Klaesi – Schlafkur und Antieidodiathese", Gesnerus 36: 246–265
 Haenel, Thomas (1982), Zur Geschichte der Psychiatrie. Birkhäuser, Basel
 Haenel, Thomas (1997), Die psychiatrische Universitätspoliklinik 1923 – 1997. Kantonsspital Basel, Universitätskliniken
Haenel, Thomas "Remarks on the 120th birthday of Jakob Klaesi", Der Nervenarzt'', Volume 74, Issue 5, 2003, p. 471-475

References

External links 
 Klaesi, Jakob, 1923 - 1933, Universitätsarchiv X 3.5 94

1883 births
1980 deaths
History of neuroscience
University of Zurich alumni
Academic staff of the University of Bern
Swiss psychiatrists
Swiss medical writers